Daniele Bracciali and David Marrero were the defending champions but decided not to participate.
Johan Brunström and Frederik Nielsen won this tournament, defeating Jamie Delgado and Jonathan Marray 5–7, 6–2, [10–7] in the final.

Seeds

Draw

Draw

External links
 Main Draw

Internazionali di Monza e Brianza - Doubles
Internazionali di Monza E Brianza